Charles F. Viebahn (1842 – March 17, 1915) was a member of the Wisconsin State Assembly.

Biography
Viebahn was born in what is now Germany in 1842. In 1851, he moved with his parents to Baraboo, Wisconsin. He attended what is now the University of Wisconsin-Madison and later became principal of Watertown High School in Watertown, Wisconsin.

Viehbahn married Lona Fischer in 1868. They had one son before her death in 1893. In 1895, Viebahn married Josephine Hall, a mother of two. He died of pneumonia at his home in Watertown on March 17, 1915.

Political career
Viebahn was elected to the Assembly in 1908. Additionally, he was Superintendent of Schools of Watertown, as well as of Manitowoc County, Wisconsin and Sauk County, Wisconsin. He was a Democrat.

References

External links
 

People from Baraboo, Wisconsin
Politicians from Watertown, Wisconsin
Democratic Party members of the Wisconsin State Assembly
Educators from Wisconsin
University of Wisconsin–Madison alumni
1842 births
1915 deaths
Deaths from pneumonia in Wisconsin
19th-century American politicians